Boyuran-e Olya (also Romanized as Boyūrān-e ‘Olyā; also known as Boyorān and Boyūrān) is a village in Baryaji Rural District, in the Central District of Sardasht County, West Azerbaijan Province, Iran. At the 2006 census, its population was 570, in 119 families.

See also 

 List of cities, towns and villages in West Azerbaijan Province

References 

Populated places in Sardasht County